Sachin Gawas (born 20 January 1984 in Goa) is an Indian footballer who last played as a defender for ONGC in the I-League.

He formerly represented Salgaocar, playing for the club from 2005 to 2008.

Career statistics

Club
Statistics accurate as of 11 May 2013

References

External links
Profile at i-league.org.

Indian footballers
1984 births
Living people
I-League players
ONGC FC players
Association football defenders
Footballers from Goa